Divulapitiya Divisional Secretariat is a  Divisional Secretariat  of Gampaha District, of Western Province, Sri Lanka.

References
 Divulapitiya Divisional Secretariat

Divisional Secretariats of Gampaha District